MJ (Original Broadway Cast Recording) is the cast album to the 2022 musical MJ. The musical tells the story of American singer, songwriter, and dancer Michael Jackson with book written by Lynn Nottage. The music and lyrics are mostly by Michael Jackson. The recording stars Myles Frost, Ayana George, Christian Wilson, Tavon Olds-Sample, Antoine L. Smith, Apollo Levine, Quentin Earl Darrington, Whitney Bashor, Trey Campbell,  Lamont Walker II. It also features Raymond Baynard and Zelig Williams.

Recording for the original Broadway cast album took place on February 7 and 8, 2022. The original Broadway cast recording was released on July 15, 2022. A snippet of Billie Jean was shared on May 19 by The New York Times in anticipation of the album. The album was nominated for a Grammy Award for Best Musical Theater Album.

Track listing

Personnel

Cast
 Myles Frost - Michael Jackson
 Ayana George - Katherine Jackson
 Christian Wilson - Little Michael
 Tavon Olds-Sample - Michael
 Antoine L. Smith - Berry Gordy / Nick
 Apollo Levine - Quincy Jones / Tito Jackson
 Quentin Earl Darrington - Joe Jackson / Rob
 Whitney Bashor - Rachel
 Trey Campbell - Little Marlon
 John Edwards - Jackie Jackson
 Lamont Walker II - Jermaine Jackson

Ensemble vocals
 Raymond Baynard 
 Zelig Williams.

Production

Musicians

Additional musicians for recording

Charts

Weekly charts

Awards

References

External links
 

Cast recordings
Theatre soundtracks
2022 soundtrack albums